Janardhana Maharshi (born 16 May) is an Indian screenwriter, poet, author, producer, novelist, lyricist & film director who works predominantly in Telugu cinema and Kannada cinema. His directorial movies namely "Devasthanam" and "Viswadarshanam" are screened in many Film festivals.

Early life
Born in Kandukuru, Prakasham district completed his schooling and higher education in Chittoor. In his college days he acted and written stage plays and published his poems and stories in many famous weeklies. He joined as a Script Assistant to Tanikella Bharani in the year 1989 and assisted him for almost 10 films and later became an independent writer in the year 1993. Right from his childhood he is a great admirer and devotee of the legendary director K. Viswanath. Maharshi proudly says that "My mother used to explain the intricate details of all K. Viswanath films due to which he became my god".

Personal life
He is married to Lakshmi Sunitha in the year 1995. The couple have two daughters Sravani Sarvamangala and Sarvani Saktipradatha. He resides in Ameerpet, Hyderabad.

Film career and filmography
He got his first break as a writer in years 1994 and 1995. His four films namely "One by Two", "Aunty" and "Pekata Papa Rao" ran for 100 days and became a very popular story, screenplay and dialogue writer. His collaboration with directors T. S. B. K. Moulee, Siva Nageswara Rao got him fame and success.

Later he joined hands with another sensational director E. V. V. Satyanarayana and the duo is an instant hit. The writer and director duo created wonders and was called the most successful combination and continued working together for nearly 25 films.

In 2004, he entered Kannada film industry and continuously delivered super hit films like "Aakash", "Arasu", "Dattha", "Meravanige", "Kannadadda Kiran Bedi" and so on. He had written 15 films in Kannada and 75 films in Telugu. He also worked closely with directors K.Raghavendra Rao and S.V.Krishna Reddy and delivered great films. He had also written dialogues for the National Award Winning Film Eega.

As a writer his famous films are Venky Mama, Hungama, Eega, Maa Nannaku Pelli (which won Nandi Award for best family picture), Kanyadanam, Chala Bagundi, Goppinti Alludu, Bava Nachadu, Maavidaakulu, Jai Bolo Telangana, Pilla Nachindi, Maayajaalam. In Kannada Natasaarvabhowma, Paramesha Panwala, Raj Vishnu, Bindaas and Bombaat etc.

He is very much acclaimed for his comedy films like Evadi Gola Vaadidhi, Pattukondi Chooddam, Maa Alludu Very Good, Sriramachandrulu, One by Two, Hungama, Once More, Pekata Papa Rao, Pavitra, Gopi – Goda Meeda Pilli and Pellala Rajyam.

He produced and directed the film "Devasthanam" starring the legendary director K. Viswanath and singer S.P. Balasubrahmanyam in the year 2013 and won numerous awards in film festivals. In the year 2020 a biopic documentary on director K. Viswanath named "Viswadarshanam" won awards in film festivals and is also widely appreciated. His films "Viswadarshanam" and "Devasthanam" were screened in more than 30 International Film Festivals. As a writer he got great appreciation for his film "Ammo! Okato Tareekhu".

From the year 2004 he started writing poetry, short stories and published 7 books till date. He won many accolades for his book "Vennamudhalu" which garnered huge response and was very widely read; so much that it was published 12 times and is ready with the 13th edition. He has also written "Garbhagudi Loki(Novel)", "Chidambara Rahasyam(Story)", "Panchaamrutham(Short Stories)", "Naaku Nenu Raasukunna Premalekha(Prose)", "Kavigaane Kanumustha(Poetry)", "Madhura Sambhashanalu(Conversations)" and is ready with his new book "Smasaanaaniki Vairagyam. Four of his books are translated in other languages too.

As a writer two of his films in Telugu and one Kannada Film are going to begin shooting in the months March and April. Right now he is going to direct a film "Pibare Ramarasam" a mythological drama based on the epic Ramayana.

He also acted in films "Pattukondi Chooddam", "Bhookailas", "Bava Nachadu", Maa Aavida Meeda Ottu Mee Aavida Chala Manchidi", "Jai Bolo Telangana", "O Panai Pothundi Babu".

Literary Works of Janardhana Maharshi

Noble Poems
 Vennamuddalu (2003)

Novels
 Garbha gudiloki (2004, 2021)

Poetry
 Naku Nenu Rasukunna Premalekha (2008)
 Kavigaane Kannumoostha (2014)

Short stories
 Panchamrutham (2005)
 Madhura Sambhashanalu (2017)

Stories
 Chidambara Rahasyam (2019)
 Smasananiki Vyragyam (2021)

See also
 List of Indian writers

References

External links
 
 
 

Living people
Telugu writers
Telugu-language writers
20th-century Indian dramatists and playwrights
Indian male dramatists and playwrights
Telugu-language dramatists and playwrights
Film directors from Hyderabad, India
Screenwriters from Hyderabad, India
21st-century Indian male writers
Telugu film directors
21st-century Indian film directors
20th-century Indian male writers
1967 births